End of Green may refer to:

"End of Green" (song), a 1993 song by Kerbdog
End of Green (band), a German doom metal band